Oedaleus is a genus of grasshoppers in the family Acrididae.

Species
The Orthoptera Species File lists the following species:
 Oedaleus abruptus (Thunberg, 1815)
 Oedaleus australis Saussure, 1888
 Oedaleus bimaculatus Zheng & Gong, 2001
 Oedaleus carvalhoi Bolívar, 1889
 Oedaleus cnecosopodius Zheng, 2000
 Oedaleus decorus (Germar, 1825)
 Oedaleus flavus (Linnaeus, 1758)
 Oedaleus formosanus (Shiraki, 1910)
 Oedaleus hyalinus Zheng & Mao, 1997
 Oedaleus immaculatus Chopard, 1957
 Oedaleus infernalis Saussure, 1884
 Oedaleus inornatus Schulthess Schindler, 1898
 Oedaleus instillatus Burr, 1900
 Oedaleus interruptus (Kirby, 1902)
 Oedaleus johnstoni Uvarov, 1941
 Oedaleus kaohsiungensis Yin, Ye & Dang, 2015
 Oedaleus manjius Chang, 1939
 Oedaleus miniatus Uvarov, 1930
 Oedaleus nadiae Ritchie, 1981
 Oedaleus nantouensis Yin, Ye & Dang, 2015
 Oedaleus nigeriensis Uvarov, 1926
 Oedaleus nigripennis Zheng, 2005
 Oedaleus nigrofasciatus (De Geer, 1773)
 Oedaleus obtusangulus Uvarov, 1936
 Oedaleus plenus (Walker, 1870)
 Oedaleus rosescens Uvarov, 1942
 Oedaleus sarasini Saussure, 1884
 Oedaleus senegalensis (Krauss, 1877)
 Oedaleus virgula (Snellen van Vollenhoven, 1869)
 Oedaleus xiai Yin, Ye & Dang, 2015

Gallery

References

External links
 
 

Acrididae genera
Caelifera